Madian is a town under the administration of Luoning County, Henan, China. , it has 24 villages under its administration.

References 

Township-level divisions of Henan
Luoning County